Han Hyeong-min (born 7 January 1971) is a South Korean boxer. He competed in the men's light welterweight event at the 1996 Summer Olympics.

References

1971 births
Living people
South Korean male boxers
Olympic boxers of South Korea
Boxers at the 1996 Summer Olympics
Place of birth missing (living people)
Light-welterweight boxers